Navtej Singh Rehal, popularly known as Naf, is the lead singer of the Indo-Danish music band named Bombay Rockers. His co-partner is Thomas Sardorf.
Rehal delivers the Punjabi vocals and plays guitar and keyboards in the band.
His debut album Introducing has gone five times platinum with sales of over 100,000 albums. It was No.1 for 15 consecutive weeks on the Indian album charts.

Rehal along with Sardorf performed for the first time in front of 25,000 people at Roskilde Festival in Denmark. His band Bombay Rockers achieved worldwide fame with the song Rock the Party.

Early life
Rehal was born in Copenhagen, Denmark, to Indian parents, and as such, he has his roots in India. He grew up in the multicultural suburb Nørrebro and went through the whole public school system – from nursery to high school in Denmark, except for two years, where he went to school in India and, as he states it: "experienced his own culture". At the age of 13, he began to dance hiphop, funk, breakdance and Indian bhangra.

Career
In the year 2003 Rehal and Sardorf met each other through a mutual friend at a record label. After then, they collaborated for the first time for the song called Ari Ari. This first single became a rage in the Danish dance clubs and got a massive national airplay in Denmark.

In 2005, Rehal along with Sardorf performed at the major Indian metropolitan cities : Bangalore, Kolkata, Mumbai and Delhi. They also performed at the International Club in Bangladesh. They also performed in the major cities in Germany. During his concert in Bangladesh, Rehal advised the audience not to buy unauthorized CDs.

Naf and Sardorf released the album Rock and Dhol in the year 2010. The duo worked out for two years for the album. It was an electro inspired album. The album consisted of 12 tracks and they also shot a video for one of the songs 'Let's dance'. Eleven songs from this album were brand new while the last one was an electro-mix version of Let's Dance. In this album, they also made the use of traditional Indian sounds like Sitar and Punjabi beats.

Discography

Filmography

Albums

Studio albums
Introducing (2005)
Crash And Burn (2007)
All Or Nothing ft. Bombay Rockers (Overseas album) (2008)
Rock And Dhol (2011)

Remix albums
Rock Tha Party (2004)

Stage shows
 COLOSSEUM 2010 College of Technology, Pantnagar G. B. Pant University of Agriculture and Technology
 Vivum Twelve, The International School Bangalore, in Whitefield, Bengaluru.
 G-Quasar 2013, Galgotias University, Greater Noida.

References

External links

June 2005 Archives – EGO Magazine
Meet the rockers The Telegraph, Calcutta – 21 May 2005

Danish people of Indian descent
Danish Sikhs
Danish male singers
Danish rock singers
Living people
Danish people of Punjabi descent
Year of birth missing (living people)